Agdestein is a Norwegian surname. People with this surname include:

 Espen Agdestein (born 1965), Norwegian entrepreneur and chess player
 Marianne Aasen Agdestein (born 1967), Norwegian politician
 Simen Agdestein (born 1967), Norwegian chess grandmaster and footballer
 Torbjørn Agdestein (born 1991), Norwegian footballer

Norwegian-language surnames